SS13 may refer to:

 Space Station 13, a video game
 Pitsea (Postcode district	SS13), a town in Essex, England
 USS C-2 (SS-13), one of five C-class submarines built for the US Navy